The Central District of Eqlid County is a district (bakhsh) in Eqlid County, Fars Province, Iran. At the 2006 census, its population was 65,798, in 13,783 families.  The District has one city: Eqlid. The District has two rural districts (dehestan): Khonjesht Rural District, and Shahr Meyan Rural District. Khosrow Shirin Rural District was also in the district, but was transferred to Central District of Abadeh County on 26 April 2007.

References 

Eqlid County
Districts of Fars Province